PNS/M Hurmat (S-136) is a  diesel-electric submarine based on the French Agosta-70-class design.

History
She was initially named SAS Adventurous for the South African Navy and laid down on 18 September 1977. The submarine was launched on 1 December 1978 at Nantes in France. On 18 February 1980, she was commissioned in the Pakistan Navy as PNS Hurmat.

See also 
 List of active Pakistan Navy ships

References 

Agosta-class submarines of the South African Navy
Hashmat-class submarines
Ships built in France
1978 ships
Submarines of Pakistan
Ships built by Chantiers Dubigeon